Lisa Nehus Saxon (born October 28, 1959) is an American professional sports writer.

While working for the Daily News of Los Angeles from 1979 until 1987, Saxon became the second woman to cover Major League Baseball as a full-time beat for a daily newspaper, joining Claire Smith, who started at the Hartford Courant a year earlier. While fighting for women to gain equal access to press boxes and locker rooms, Saxon endured both verbal and physical abuse: "Going into the locker room, knots would get in my stomach; it was actually a physically uncomfortable thing to do because you didn't know what you would face.  At the very least, you would have jockstraps thrown at you, and dirty undergarments.  And that was an everyday occurrence.  And then you would just build onto that what might happen. And you just hoped for the best when you went in." At one point the abuse became so horrific that Angels players George Hendrick and John Candelaria stepped in to create a human shield between Saxon and one of her greatest tormentors, Reggie Jackson. Saxon said she did not go public with much of the abuse, because she feared that doing so would derail the ongoing efforts to allow women to have equal access to the team clubhouses.

Saxon won numerous writing awards during her journalism career, which spanned four decades. She also worked at the Long Beach Press-Telegram and Riverside Press-Enterprise. In 2001, she began teaching Media, accepting jobs at Santa Monica College and Palisades Charter High School.

Saxon received a bachelor's degree in journalism from California State University, Northridge in 1983 and a graduate degree from Mount St. Mary's University in 2009. She left journalism in 2001 to become an educator. In 2016 and 2017, she was a featured speaker at events sponsored by the Baseball Reliquary. Saxon also appeared in some episodes of "The Sweet Spot, A Treasury of Baseball Stories," an anthology series by Jon Leonoudakis.

References

1959 births
American women sportswriters
Sportswriters from California
Living people
American women non-fiction writers
21st-century American women
California State University, Northridge alumni
Mount St. Mary's University alumni